Convoy JW 56A was an Arctic convoy sent from Great Britain by the Western Allies to aid the Soviet Union during World War II. It sailed in January 1944, reaching the Soviet northern ports at the end of the month. Twelve ships arrived safely.
During the voyage JW 56A was attacked by a German U-boat force; three ships were sunk and one of the escorts damaged in the operation.

Ships
The convoy consisted of 20 merchant ships which departed from Loch Ewe on 12 January 1944.
Close escort was provided by a force led by Inconstant and two corvettes, with two more destroyers joining later. There was also an Ocean escort, comprising the destroyer Hardy (Capt. WGA Robson commanding) and five other destroyers.
The convoy was also accompanied initially by a local escort group from Britain, and was also joined later by a local escort group from Murmansk. 
A cruiser cover force comprising Kent (R.Adm AFE Palliser), Berwick and Bermuda also followed the convoy, to guard against attack by surface units.

JW 56A was opposed by a U-boat force of 10 boats in a patrol line, code-named Isengrim, in the Norwegian Sea.

Ships In The Convoy

Action
JW 56A departed Loch Ewe on 12 January 1944, accompanied by its local escort, of two minesweepers and two corvettes, and a close escort of three destroyers and two corvettes.
Three days out from Loch Ewe, on 15 January, JW 56A ran into a storm, forcing the convoy to shelter at Akureyri in Iceland, which it reached on 18 January.
After another three days the storm abated and on 21 January JW 56A was able to depart, though five ships were forced to drop out with storm damage. The convoy was joined on 21 January by Hardy and her group, but the following day the local escort departed, leaving an escort force of ten warships to see the convoy through.

Despite search patrols by German aircraft the convoy was not found in the prevailing gloom of the polar night, but  on 25 January JW 56A passed the northernmost U-boat of the patrol line, which broadcast an alert and commenced shadowing.

Later on 25 January the attack started, continuing throughout the day and following night. The seven boats in contact made a total of seventeen attacks over a twelve-hour period.
Later U-278 hit Penelope Barker, which sank.
Just after midnight U-360 hit Fort Bellingham, which was crippled, and  hit Andrew G Curtin, which sank.
Later, at around 5am,  under the command of Gerhard Schaar also hit Fort Bellingham, which was sunk.

All other attacks were beaten off, and during 26 January the convoy was able to shake off further pursuit.

On 27 January JW 56A was met by the local escort, three Soviet destroyers from Murmansk, and the ocean  escort detached, to head back through the Isengrim patrol area to meet and re-inforce the following  convoy JW 56B.
Meanwhile, JW 56A arrived at Kola  without further losses on 28 January 1944.

Conclusion
Despite the loss of three ships, and the return of five others, twelve ships had arrived safely, making JW 56A a qualified success.
Convoy JW 56A was followed into Murmansk five days later by JW 56B.

Notes

References
 Clay Blair : Hitler's U-Boat War [Volume 2]: The Hunted 1942–1945 (1998)  (2000 UK paperback ed.)
 Paul Kemp : Convoy! Drama in Arctic Waters (1993) 
 Paul Kemp  : U-Boats Destroyed  ( 1997) .  
 Axel Neistle  : German U-Boat Losses during World War II  (1998). 
 Bob Ruegg, Arnold Hague : Convoys to Russia (1992) 
 Bernard Schofield : (1964) The Russian Convoys BT Batsford  ISBN (none)
  JW 56A at Convoyweb

JW 56A
C